were officials during feudal Japan. Shugodai were representatives of provincial shugo when the shugo could not exercise his power, being often away from his province. Unlike shugo, who were appointed from the central power, shugodai were locally appointed.

At the brink of the Sengoku period, most shugo strengthened their grip on power, leading to the effective disappearance of their shugodai. However, taking advantage of the weakening of their Shugo due to war or other circumstance, some shugodai became the effective lords of their provinces. A typical example of shugodai becoming effective daimyōs would be Oda Nobuhide, the Oda clan of Owari Province.

Notable Shugodai clan
 Oda clan
 Asakura clan
 Nagao clan
 Miyoshi clan
 Amago clan
 Saitō clan

References

Government of feudal Japan